The Pacific Northwest Golf Association (PNGA) was established on February 4, 1899 and serves as a golf governing body that conducts championships and promotes golf activities to golfers located in the Pacific Northwest region of North America. The territory of the PNGA is divided into five different zones, made up of about 175,000 members and 650 golf courses.

Championships 
The PNGA conducts 16 championships for amateur golfers in the Pacific Northwest throughout the year.

 PNGA Cup
 Men's Master-40 Amateur Championship
 Senior Men's Amateur Championship
 Super Senior Men's Amateur Championship
 Men's Amateur Championship
 Women's Amateur Championship
 Women's Mid-Amateur Championship
 Junior Boys' Amateur Championship
 Junior Girls' Amateur Championship
 Men's Mid-Amateur Championship
 Women's Senior Team Championship
 Women's Super Senior Team Championship
 Men's Senior Team Championship
 Men's Super Senior Team Championship
 Senior Women's Amateur
 Super Senior Women's Amateur

Allied associations 
The PNGA works with six allied associations to help grow the game of golf in North America. 
 United States Golf Association
 Golf Canada
 British Columbia Golf
 Idaho Golf Association
 Oregon Golf Association
 Washington State Golf Association

Zone breakdown 
The PNGA is broken down into five different zones which make up all of the 175,000 members and 650 golf courses.
 Zone 1: Oregon
 Zone 2: Eastern Washington
 Zone 3: Western Washington and Alaska
 Zone 4: British Columbia and Alberta
 Zone 5: Idaho and Montana

References

External links 

Golf associations
Golf in Oregon
Golf in Washington (state)